Diego Lima da Silva (born June 18, 1990, in Rio de Janeiro) is a Brazilian goalkeeper formed in the Flamengo. He currently plays for Clube de Regatas do Flamengo reserves team.

Career

Diego Lima da Silva was goalkeeper of the team of the Flamengo youth in 2007. In 2006, his first year in the category, won the  Campeonato Carioca de Juvenis. The next year, lifted the Copa Macaé and Torneio Circuito das Águas.

The shirt also had an opportunity in the juniores category. He joined a group that ranked third in the Champions Youth Cup, the interclub championship for players under 19 years.

In 2010, he had his first chance with the professional group of Flamengo and traveled to the intertemporal in Itu, São Paulo, in preparation for the sequel to the Campeonato Brasileiro.

Career statistics
(Correct )

according to combined sources on the Flamengo official website and Flaestatística.

Honours
 Flamengo
Campeonato Carioca Juvenil: 2006
Torneio Internacional Circuito das Águas: 2006, 2007
Copa Macaé: 2007

Contract
 Flamengo - October 1, 2009 to December 31, 2011.

References

External links
 ogol
 Player profile @ Flapédia

Living people
Brazilian footballers
CR Flamengo footballers
1990 births
Association football goalkeepers
Footballers from Rio de Janeiro (city)